Cryptodrassus is a genus of ground spiders that was first described by F. Miller in 1943.

Species
 it contains ten species:
Cryptodrassus beijing Lin & Li, 2022 – China
Cryptodrassus creticus Chatzaki, 2002 – Greece (Crete), Turkey
Cryptodrassus helvoloides (Levy, 1998) – Israel
Cryptodrassus helvolus (O. Pickard-Cambridge, 1872) – Russia (Europe), Turkey, Cyprus, Israel, Iran, Kazakhstan
Cryptodrassus hungaricus (Balogh, 1935) (type) – France to Greece and Russia (Europe, Caucasus)
Cryptodrassus iranicus Zamani, Chatzaki, Esyunin & Marusik, 2021 – Iran
Cryptodrassus khajuriai (Tikader & Gajbe, 1976) – India
Cryptodrassus mahabalei (Tikader, 1982) – India
Cryptodrassus platnicki (Gajbe, 1987) – India
Cryptodrassus ratnagiriensis (Tikader & Gajbe, 1976) – India

References

Araneomorphae genera
Gnaphosidae